Vladislav Vadimovich Shpitalny (born 5 September 1996) is a Russian football player. He plays for FC Torpedo Miass.

Club career
He made his debut in the Russian Football National League for FC Sokol Saratov on 15 October 2016 in a game against FC Yenisey Krasnoyarsk.

Personal life
His father Vadim Shpitalny played in the Russian First Division for FC Sokol Saratov and FC Amkar Perm. His grandfather, also called Vadim Shpitalny, played for Sokol Saratov in the Soviet First League and then was the manager of Sokol.

References

External links
 Profile by Russian Football National League
 Vladislav Shpitalny at ZeroZero
 
 

1996 births
Living people
Russian footballers
Association football midfielders
FC Rubin Kazan players
FC Amkar Perm players
FC Sokol Saratov players
U.S.C. Paredes players
U.D. Leiria players
FC Yenisey Krasnoyarsk players
FC Belshina Bobruisk players
FC Torpedo Miass players
Russian First League players
Russian Second League players
Campeonato de Portugal (league) players
Belarusian Premier League players
Russian expatriate footballers
Expatriate footballers in Portugal
Expatriate footballers in Belarus
Russian expatriate sportspeople in Portugal
Russian expatriate sportspeople in Belarus